Boethos may refer to:

 the Greek sculptor Boëthus
 The late Roman statesman and philosopher Boethius, who was made a Christian saint
 A Greek name for Hotepsekhemwy
 A high-priestly family in ancient Judea